Redus is a surname. Notable people with the surname include:

Gary Redus (born 1956), American baseball player
Frog Redus (born Wilson Robert Redus, 1905–1979), American baseball player

See also
Redux (disambiguation)
Reedus